Middle Francia was a short-lived Frankish kingdom which was created in 843 by the Treaty of Verdun after an intermittent civil war between the grandsons of Charlemagne resulted in division of the united empire. Middle Francia was allocated to emperor Lothair I, the eldest son and successor of emperor Louis the Pious. His realm contained the imperial cities of Aachen (the residence of Charlemagne) and Pavia, but lacked any geographic or cultural cohesion, which prevented it from surviving and forming a nucleus of a larger state, as was the case with West Francia (which became the Kingdom of France) and East Francia (which became the Kingdom of Germany).

Middle Francia was situated between the realms of East and West Francia, and comprised the Frankish territory between the rivers Rhine and Scheldt, the Frisian coast of the North Sea, the former Kingdom of Burgundy (except for a western portion, later known as Bourgogne) and Provence, as well as parts of northern Italy. Following the 855 partition, 'Middle Francia' became only a geographic term and the bulk of its territory was reorganized as Lotharingia, named after Lothair I's namesake son.

Partition of 855
In 855, on his deathbed at Prüm Abbey, Emperor Lothair I with the Treaty of Prüm divided Middle Francia among his three sons. The lands in northern Italy, which extended as far south as Rome and Spoleto, were left to the eldest son Louis II the Younger, crowned co-Emperor in 850 and sole Emperor from 855. This eventually became the Kingdom of Italy. Most of the lands north of the Alps, comprising the Low Countries, the western Rhineland, the lands today on the border between France and Germany, and what is now western Switzerland, passed to Lothair II and were called Lotharingia, after its ruler. Charles received the Kingdom of Burgundy (Upper Burgundy and Lower Burgundy) and Provence.

Later partitions

Charles died early and without sons in 863. According to Frankish custom, his brothers Louis II and Lothair II divided his realm. Lothair II received the western Lower Burgundian parts (bishoprics of Lyon, Vienne, Vivarais and Uzès) which were bordering his western Upper Burgundy (remnants of his original Burgundian possessions) which were incorporated into Lotharingia; while Louis II received the Kingdom of Provence.

When Lothair II died in 869, his only son Hugh by his mistress Waldrada was declared illegitimate, so his only legal heir was his brother, Louis II. If Louis II had inherited Lotharingia, Middle Francia would have been reunited. However, as Louis II was at that time campaigning against the Emirate of Bari, Lotharingia was partitioned between his uncles Charles the Bald and Louis the German by the Treaty of Meerssen in 870. Louis the German took Upper Burgundy, territory north of the Jura mountains (Bourgogne Transjurane), while the rest went to Charles the Bald.

In 875 the last of Lothair I's children Louis II died without sons and named as his successor in Italy his cousin Carloman of Bavaria, eldest son of Louis the German. However, Pope John VIII, dealing with the constant threat of raiders from the Emirate of Sicily, sided with Charles the Bald. After much confusion and conflict, Charles the Bald took Louis' realm in Italy. Carloman was crowned King of Bavaria in 876 and invaded Italy in 877 to claim the Kingdom of Italy, but on his death in 880 also without any legitimate heirs, his kingdom went to his younger brother, King Charles the Fat. Charles was crowned Emperor by Pope John VIII in 881 and thus he reunited the entire Carolingian Empire in 884, although it lasted only until Charles' overthrow in 887.

See also
History of Burgundy
Kingdom of Burgundy

References

Sources
 John M. Riddle: A History of the Middle Ages: 300–1500. Rowman & Littlefield Publishers, 2008. .
 Timothy Reuter (ed.): The New Cambridge Medieval History, Volume 3: c. 900–c. 1024. Cambridge: Cambridge University Press, 2005. .
 

Carolingian Empire
States and territories established in the 840s
States and territories disestablished in the 850s
855 disestablishments
Former countries in Europe
Lotharingia
843 establishments
9th-century disestablishments in Europe
9th-century establishments in Europe
Former monarchies